Glenea versuta is a species of beetle in the family Cerambycidae. It was described by Newman in 1832. It is known from the Philippines.

Subspecies
 Glenea versuta palawanicola Breuning, 1956
 Glenea versuta versuta Newman, 1832

References

versuta
Beetles described in 1832